Solitudes is a monotypic genus of east Asian ground spiders containing the single species, Solitudes dushengi. It was first described by Y. J. Lin and S. Q. Li in 2020 and added to the new subfamily, Solitudinae.  it has only been found in China.

See also
 List of Gnaphosidae species

References

Gnaphosidae
Spiders of China